Lower Staircase is the lower, eastern portion of Skelton Glacier, between The Landing and Clinker Bluff in the Hillary Coast region of the Ross Dependency, Antarctica. It was surveyed and given this descriptive name in 1957 by the New Zealand party of the Commonwealth Trans-Antarctic Expedition, 1956–58.

References

Glaciers of the Ross Dependency
Hillary Coast